UAE Team Emirates is an Emirati road bicycle racing team. The team competes at UCI WorldTeam level and has done so since the UCI World Tour was formed as the top category of road cycling in 2005. However the team was temporarily suspended from the ProTour in 2010, missing one ProTour event.

Transition from an Italian-based team

Chinese involvement
In August 2016 the team (then called Lampre-Merida) confirmed that its WorldTeam licence was being transferred from CGS Cycling to Chinese company TJ Sport Consultation, with the team becoming the first Chinese WorldTour team from 2017. Former  team manager Mauro Gianetti was announced as the co-ordinator for the project. In an interview with La Gazzetta dello Sport the following month, Saronni confirmed that he and CGS Cycling would continue to manage the team on TJ Sport's behalf, and that the team's bicycles would be supplied by Colnago. He indicated that the project was being co-ordinated by the Chinese government via TJ Sport with involvement from a number of Chinese companies including Alibaba, and that its aim was to develop Chinese cycling and riders. However, when the UCI awarded 17 WorldTour licences to teams in November, it announced that TJ Sport's application was "under review" by its Licensing Commission. According to Saronni, the reason for the delay was that the head of the TJ Sport project, Li Zhiqiang, had fallen seriously ill, which prevented funding for the project from being confirmed.

Emirati rescue
As a result, the team looked elsewhere for sponsorship, securing funding from the United Arab Emirates and changing its name to UAE Abu Dhabi. The UCI confirmed the team's WorldTour licence on 20 December. In February 2017, the team announced that airline Emirates had signed on with the team as a naming-rights sponsor. The team was subsequently known as UAE Team Emirates. In June 2017, two days before the 2017 Tour de France the team announced it would also be sponsored by the First Abu Dhabi Bank, an amalgamation of the First Gulf Bank and the National Bank of Abu Dhabi, with their logo being added to the chest and side of the team's jersey.

Team roster

Major wins

National, continental, and world champions

1999
 Belgian Road Race, Ludo Dierckxsens
2000
 South African Time Trial, Robbie Hunter
 Latvian Time Trial, Raivis Belohvoščiks
2001
 Latvian Time Trial, Raivis Belohvoščiks
2002
 Latvian Time Trial, Raivis Belohvoščiks
 Latvian Road Race, Raivis Belohvoščiks
2005
 Austrian Road Race, Gerrit Glomser
2006
 Italian Time Trial, Marzio Bruseghin
2007
 Slovenian Road Race, Tadej Valjavec
2008
 World Road Race, Alessandro Ballan
2011
 Slovenian Road Race, Grega Bole
 Ukrainian Road Race, Oleksandr Kvachuk
 Ukrainian Time Trial, Oleksandr Kvachuk
 Italian Time Trial, Adriano Malori
2014
 Portuguese Time Trial, Nelson Oliveira
 Portuguese Road Race, Nelson Oliveira
2015
 Portuguese Time Trial, Nelson Oliveira
 Ethiopian Road Race, Tsgabu Grmay
 Ethiopian Time Trial, Tsgabu Grmay
 Portuguese Road Race, Rui Costa
 Slovenian Road Race, Luka Pibernik
 Taiwanese Road Race, Feng Chun-kai
 Taiwanese Time Trial, Feng Chun-kai
2017
 UAE Time Trial, Yousif Mirza
 UAE Road Race, Yousif Mirza
 Slovenian Time Trial, Jan Polanc
 European Track (Individual pursuit), Filippo Ganna
2018
 World Track (Individual pursuit), Filippo Ganna
 UAE Time Trial, Yousif Mirza
 UAE Road Race, Yousif Mirza
 Norwegian Road Race, Vegard Stake Laengen
2019
 UAE Time Trial, Yousif Mirza
 UAE Road Race, Yousif Mirza
 Slovenian Time Trial, Tadej Pogačar
2020
 Slovenian Time Trial, Tadej Pogačar
 Portuguese Time Trial, Ivo Oliveira
 Portuguese Road Race, Rui Costa
 Norwegian Road Race, Sven Erik Bystrøm
 European Track (Individual pursuit), Ivo Oliveira
2021
 African Time Trial, Ryan Gibbons
 UAE Road Race, Yousif Mirza
 UAE Time Trial, Yousif Mirza
 African Road Race, Ryan Gibbons
  South Africa Time Trial, Ryan Gibbons
2022
 UAE Road Race, Yousif Mirza
 UAE Time Trial, Yousif Mirza
 Swiss Time Trial, Joel Suter  
 Portuguese Road Race, João Almeida
2023
 Australian Time Trial, Jay Vine

References

External links

 
UCI WorldTeams
Cycling teams based in Italy
Cycling teams based in the United Arab Emirates
Cycling teams established in 1991
1991 establishments in Italy
Cycling teams established in 2017
2017 establishments in the United Arab Emirates